Busbee is a surname. Notable people with the surname include:

George Busbee (1927–2004), American politician
Juliana Royster Busbee, American artist
Matthew Busbee, American swimmer
Perrin Busbee, coach of the North Carolina State college football program (1892–1897)
Shirlee Busbee (born 1941), American novelist
Jay Busbee, American novelist/journalist
busbee (1976–2019), American songwriter

See also 
Busby (disambiguation)